Alexander Lyle was a naval officer.

Alexander Lyle may also refer to:

Alexander Lyle of the Lyle baronets
Sandy Lyle (born 1958), Scottish golfer
Alexander Lyle-Samuel (1883–1942), British businessman and politician